Hellen Kahunde, also Helen Kahunde (born 27 November 1982), is a Ugandan educator and politician who serves as the Member of Parliament representing the Kiryandongo District Women' Constituency in the 10th Parliament (2016 to 2021). In 2021 she was re elected into parliament. In the eleventh parliament, she serves on the Committee on East African Community Affairs.

Background and education
She was born in Uganda on 27 November 2018 She attended Gulu Sacred Heart Secondary School in Gulu, the largest city in the Northern Region of Uganda, for her Ordinary Level studies. She transferred to Our Lady of Good Counsel Secondary School, in Gayaza, Wakiso District, where she completed her high school studies.

She was admitted to Gulu University in 2003, graduating in 2007 with a Bachelor of Science Education. Later, she graduated from the Uganda Management Institute, in Kampala, with a Postgraduate Diploma in Monitoring and Evaluation.

Career
Before joining elective politics, she taught science at Kigumba Intensive Secondary School, in Kigumba, Kiryandongo District, from 2008 until 2008.

In 2011, she contested for the Women Constituency in Kiryandongo District. She won, becoming the first-ever Women's Member of Parliament in the district that was created on 1 July 2010. She was re-elected in 2016, running again on the ruling National Resistance Movement political party ticket.

In parliament she is a member of the "Committee on Science and Technology" and a member of the "Committee on Presidential Affairs".

Family
Helen Kahunde is married.

See also
 Monica Azuba Ntege
 Winnie Kiiza
 Ruth Nankabirwa

References

External links
Website of the Parliament of Uganda
Museveni silences MP on complaints over investors As of 13 April 2018.

1982 births
Living people
Ugandan educators
Gulu University alumni
Members of the Parliament of Uganda
21st-century Ugandan women
People from Kiryandongo District
Uganda Management Institute alumni
People from Western Region, Uganda
National Resistance Movement politicians
Women members of the Parliament of Uganda
21st-century Ugandan politicians
21st-century Ugandan women politicians